AANS may refer to:

 American Association of Neurological Surgeons, a scientific and educational association focused on advancing the specialty of neurological surgery. The organization has over 8,000 members around the world.
 Australian Army Nursing Service, an Australian Army Reserve unit which provided a pool of trained civilian nurses who had volunteered for military service during wartime